Stephen Chilcott was the editor of Weekly Business Programs on BBC Radio in London, based at BBC White City. He was responsible for a wide range of national radio programs on business and money including BBC World Service's Global Business, BBC Radio 4's Moneybox and Moneybox Live, Radio 4's In Business, and Radio 4's Bottom Line. He was also editorially responsible for some business focussed documentaries, including Privacy in Peril, Jay-Z - From Brooklyn to the Boardroom.

According to the media guide in Real Business UK Magazine, called 'The People to Know' guide; "...the other key editor is Stephen Chilcott. He’s the editor of 'business programmes'. These are mainly influential radio slots such as Moneybox, In Business and the now-weekly Nice Work and Shop Talk. Chilcott is naturally empathetic and is determined to get more smaller-business stories onto the mainstream schedules."

Chilcott retired from the BBC in March 2013 after 32 years with the Corporation. He'd joined as a technical trainee before moving into editorial roles.

References

British editors
Year of birth missing (living people)
Living people